Molecules Remix EP is an extended play (EP) and remix album by Australian alternative rock band Atlas Genius. It was released on 13 November 2015 by Warner Bros. Records.

This release contains remixes of the single "Molecules," taken from Atlas Genius' second studio album, Inanimate Objects.

Track listing

Release history

References

2015 EPs
2015 remix albums
Atlas Genius EPs
Atlas Genius remix albums
Remix EPs
Warner Records EPs
Warner Records remix albums